The 963d Airborne Air Control Squadron is a squadron of the United States Air Force based at Tinker Air Force Base, Oklahoma.  The squadron is a subordinate unit of the 552d Operations Group and it flies the Boeing E-3 Sentry radar surveillance aircraft.  The squadron currently falls under the authority of Air Combat Command and Twelfth Air Force.

Emblem
The 963d's mascot is the Blue Knight which is represented on the unit's insignia as a blue colored winged chess knight.  The background is a series of black and white squares that resembles a chess board. Three bolts of lightning emitted from the knight's eye shows the lightning fast deployability of the AWACS, and the knight's wings represents the flying mission of the unit.

History

The 963d Airborne Early Warning and Control Squadron was activated, on 8 July 1955 at McClellan Air Force Base, California.  The squadron flew the EC-121 Warning Star, which was a military version of the Lockheed Constellation aircraft, until the unit's inactivation in April 1976.

The inactivation lasted less than a week however, as the Air Force again activated the unit on 5 May 1976 and redesignated it as the 963d Airborne Warning and Control Squadron (963 AWACS). On 1 July 1976, the squadron relocated to Tinker AFB, Oklahoma. The squadron was under the command of the 552 AWACW, which reported directly to Headquarters, Tactical Air Command.  The squadron began flying the new E-3 Sentry aircraft upon being reactivated.  This new airframe is a military version of the Boeing 707 aircraft.

During the 1980s the squadron flew training missions in Saudi Arabia and throughout the Middle East.

In 1990 the squadron deployed to Riyadh AB, Saudi Arabia with the military build-up prior to Operations Desert Shield/Desert Storm.

In 1992, the unit (and its superior unit the 552 Wing) came under the authority of the newly formed Air Combat Command.  Throughout the early to mid-1990s, 963d aircrews routinely deployed to Incirlik AB, Turkey to support the northern Iraqi no-fly zone (Operation Provide Comfort).  Crews from the 963d also continued operations in Saudi Arabia on the southern no-fly zone (Operation Southern Watch).  They were also deployed to other trouble spots around the world as a modern form of Gunboat diplomacy.  On April 14, 1994, an aircraft and crew from the 963d operating out of Incirlik Air Base, Turkey featured prominently in the 1994 Black Hawk shootdown incident.

In 1994, the squadron's name was redesignated to 963d Airborne Air Control Squadron.

The 963d AACS also participated in the invasion of Iraq in Operation Iraqi Freedom.

Operations
World War II
Vietnam War
Operation Just Cause
Operation Earnest Will
Operation Desert Storm

Lineage
 3 Search Attack Squadron
 Constituted as the 3d Sea-Search Attack Squadron (Heavy) on 7 December 1942
 Activated on 10 December 1942
 Redesignated 3d Search Attack Squadron (Heavy) on 22 November 1943
 Disbanded on 10 April 1944
 Reconstituted on 19 September 1985 and consolidated with the 163d Liaison Squadron and the 963d Airborne Warning and Control Squadron as the 963d Airborne Warning and Control Squadron

 163d Liaison Squadron
 Constituted as the 163d Liaison Squadron on 11 May 1944
 Activated on 15 May 1944
 Inactivated on 27 January 1946
 Activated on 3 October 1946
 Inactivated on 1 April 1949
 Consolidated on 19 September 1985 with the 3d Search Attack Squadron and the 963d Airborne Warning and Control Squadron as the 963d Airborne Warning and Control Squadron

 963d Airborne Air Control Squadron
 Constituted as the 963d Airborne Early Warning and Control Squadron on 8 December 1954
 Activated on 8 March 1955
 Inactivated on 30 April 1976
 Redesignated 963d Airborne Warning and Control Squadron on 5 May 1976
 Activated on 1 Jul 1976
 Consolidated on 19 September 1985 with the 3d Search Attack Squadron and the 163d Liaison Squadron
 Redesignated 963d Airborne Air Control Squadron on 1 July 1994

Assignments
 1st Sea–Search Attack Group (later 1st Sea-Search Attack Unit; 1st Search Attack Group), 10 December 1942 – 10 April 1944
 III Tactical Air Division, 15 May 1944
 Army Air Forces, Pacific Ocean Areas, 20 January 1945 (attached to Tenth Army for operations)
 Seventh Air Force, 14 July 1945 (remained attached to Tenth Army until 10 August 1945)
 VII Bomber Command, 1 December 1945
 Pacific Air Command, United States Army, 25 December 1945 – 27 January 1946
 Ninth Air Force, 3 October 1946
 Tenth Air Force, 1 December 1948 – 1 April 1949
 8th Air Division, 8 March 1955 (attached to Airborne Early Warning and Control Wing, Provisional until 7 July 1955)
 552d Airborne Early Warning and Control Wing (later 552d Airborne Warning and Control Group), 8 July 1955 – 30 April 1976
 552d Airborne Warning and Control Wing (later 552d Airborne Warning and Control Division, 552d Airborne Warning and Control Wing, 552d Air Control Wing), 1 July 1976
 552d Operations Group, 29 May 1992 – present

Bases stationed

Langley Field, Virginia, 10 December 1942 – 10 April 1944
Cox Field, Texas, 15 May 1944
Brownwood Army Air Field, Texas, 8 October 1944 – 1 January 1945
Schofield Barracks, Hawaii, 20 January – 6 April 1945
Kadena Air Force Base, Okinawa, 3 May 1945

Fort William McKinley, Luzon, Philippines, c. 24 December 1945 – 27 January 1946
Marshall Field (later Marshall Air Force Base), Kansas, 3 October 1946 – 1 April 1949
McClellan Air Force Base, California, 8 March 1955 – 30 April 1976
Tinker Air Force Base, Oklahoma, 1 July 1976 – present)

Aircraft

 Douglas B-18 Bolo (1942–1943)
 Consolidated B-24 Liberator (1943–1944)
 Stinson L-5 Sentinel (1944–1945) (1946–1949)
 Noorduyn C-64 Norseman (1944)
 Piper L-4 Grasshopper (1945)
Beechcraft C-45 Expeditor (1946–1947)
Sikorsky R-5 (later H-5) (1947–1949)

 Sikorsky R-6 (1947)
 Stinson L-13 (1948–1949)
 Lockheed RC-121 Constellation (1955–1959 & 1961–1963)
 Lockheed TC–121 (1959–1961 & 1972–1975)
 Lockheed EC-121 Warning Star (1963–1972)
 Lockheed C-121 Constellation (1969–1976)
 Boeing E-3 Sentry (1976–Present)

References

External links
  
 GlobalSecurity.org 963d Airborne Air Control Squadron (963 AACS)
 GlobalSecurity.org 552d Air Control Wing (552 ACW)

Military units and formations in Oklahoma
963